Gastromyzon danumensis is a species of ray-finned fish in the genus Gastromyzon.

Footnotes

External links 

 Photo

Gastromyzon
Fish described in 1989